Lusitanops macrapex is a species of sea snail, a marine gastropod mollusc in the family Raphitomidae.

Description

Distribution
This species occurs in the North Atlantic Ocean.

References

 Revision of the north east Atlantic bathyal and abyssal Turridae (Mollusca, Gastropoda). Journal of Molluscan Studies Supplement, 8 1980: 1–119. 87
 Gofas, S.; Le Renard, J.; Bouchet, P. (2001). Mollusca. in: Costello, M.J. et al. (eds), European Register of Marine Species: a check-list of the marine species in Europe and a bibliography of guides to their identification. Patrimoines Naturels. 50: 180–213.

External links
 MNHN, Paris: holotype
 
 Intergovernmental Oceanographic Commission (IOC) of UNESCO. The Ocean Biogeographic Information System (OBIS)

macrapex
Gastropods described in 1980